Eva Josephine Jellett (8 April 1880 – 2 July 1955), doctor, was the first woman to graduate in medicine from Dublin University.

Early life and study
Jellett was born in Wellington Row to John Hewitt Jellett who was a clergyman, mathematician, and provost of Trinity College Dublin (TCD), and his wife and cousin Dora Charlotte Morgan (1823–1911) who was from Tivoli, Co. Cork. Jellett was initially educated by governesses from Germany and later sent to Alexandra college. She was one of the early women students, matriculating in 1897, who attended courses in the Catholic University of Ireland School of Medicine, St Cecilia St., Dublin. She transferred to TCD in 1904 once women were permitted to attend that college. She graduated with her MB in September 1905 making her the University's first women graduate in medicine. Her niece was the artist Mainie Jellett.

Career
After working as a clinical clerk in the Coombe Hospital in Dublin, Jellet moved to India in 1906 to take up a position in the Dublin University Mission in Hazaribagh. Once she arrived in 1908 she was able to run the newly founded women's hospital, St Columba's Hospital for Women. In 1919 she was promoted to head associate giving her control over all the female staff in India. She stepped down as head in 1923 and returned in 1924 having spent almost all her time at that hospital. She spent one year, 1917, in the British military hospital in Bombay.

Death
After she retired, Jellet moved to Switzerland for some years before finally moving, c 1938, to Gorranhaven, St Austell, Cornwall. It was there she died.

Further reading
 Thom, 1906 
 Medical Directory, 1906–58 
 Medical Register, 1906–58 
 Light and Life: the Dublin University Missionary Magazine, ix, no. 6 (1917) 
 K. W. S. Kennedy, Fifty years in Chota Nagpur (1939) Rosemary ffoliott, The Pooles of Mayfield (1955)
 R. B. McDowell and D. A. Webb, Trinity College Dublin 1592–1952: an academic history (1982)
 John Fleetwood, The history of medicine in Ireland (1983)
 F. O. C. Meenan, Cecilia Street: the Catholic University School of Medicine 1855–1931 (1987)
 J. B. Lyons, ‘History of early women doctors’, Irish Medical Times: Women in medicine, special supplement (Jan. 1992), 38–40
 GRO (Ire. and UK)

References

1868 births
1958 deaths
Alumni of Trinity College Dublin
Medical doctors from Dublin (city)
Irish women medical doctors